General elections were held in Macedonia on 16 October 1994 to elect a President and Assembly, with a second round of Assembly elections on 30 October. The presidential election was won by Kiro Gligorov of the Alliance for Macedonia (a coalition of the Social Democratic Union, Liberal Party and the Socialist Party), whilst the parties forming Alliance for Macedonia also won the Assembly elections with 95 of the 120 seats. However, the second round of the Assembly elections were boycotted by VMRO-DPMNE and the Democratic Party, as they claimed there had been irregularities in the first round.

Electoral system
The 120 members of the Assembly were elected in 120 single-member constituencies. If no candidate received over 50% in the first round, a second round was held and contested by every candidate who received over 7% of the vote in the first round. In the second round a majority was not required, and the candidate who received the most votes won the seat.

Results

President

Assembly

References

Elections in North Macedonia
Macedonia
1994 in the Republic of Macedonia
Presidential elections in North Macedonia
October 1994 events in Europe